Kaouther Adimi, (born 1986 Algiers) is a writer, graduate in modern literature and human resources management. She works today in Paris, where she has lived since 2009.

Life 
Kaouther Adimi was born in Algiers, Algeria, in 1986. From the age of four to the age of eight, she lived with her family in Grenoble, France. During this period, she discovered the pleasure of reading, by going to the public library every week with her dad.

In 1994, she returned to Algeria, which was then under the influence of terrorism. Having very few opportunities to read, she started to write her own stories.

While she was studying in the Algiers University, she entered a writing contest organized by the French Institute, for the young writers in Muret (Haute-Garonne). The short story she submitted held the attention of the jury who published it in a collection alongside the other laureates' productions. Thanks to this contest, she was invited to Muret, then Toulouse, and finally Paris, where she met with les éditions Barzakh.

She has a degree in modern literature and human resources management.

In 2009, she wrote her first novel L'envers des autres. The same year, she left Algiers for Paris.

Works 

 Le Chuchotement des anges, her first short story, published in the collection of short stories Ne rien faire et autres nouvelles, editions Buchet/Chastel, march 2007
 L'Envers des autres Arles, France] : Actes sud, 2011. , 
 Des pierres dans ma poche, Paris: Éditions du Seuil, DL 2016. , 
 Le Sixième Œuf, nouvelle sombre, in Alger, la nuit, éditions Barzakh, 2011
 Nos richesses, éditions du Seuil, 2017. ,   Translated by Chris Andrews as Our Riches (New Directions, 2020).
 Les petits de Décembre, éditions du Seuil, 2019. 
 Au vent mauvais, roman, éditions du Seuil, 2022.

Awards and honours 

 2011, Prix littéraire de la Vocation, for L'Envers des Autres
 2015, Prix du roman de la fondation France-Algérie
 2008, Prix du FELIV (Festival international de la littérature et du livre de jeunesse d’Alger) 
 2008, Prix du jeune écrivain de langue française, for Pied de vierge
 2017, Prix Renaudot des lycéens for Nos richesses
 2017, Prix du Style for Nos richesses
 2018, Prix Beur FM Méditerranée for Nos richesses
 2018, Choix Goncourt de l'Italie 2018 for Nos richesses.
 2018, Special mention Prix littéraire Giuseppe Primoli  for Nos richesses.
 2020, Prix du roman métis des lycéens for Les Petits de décembre

References

External links 
 Official page — Actes Sud
 Nos Richesses, Kaouther Adimi, éditions du Seuil, 2017

1986 births
Algerian writers in French
Living people
21st-century Algerian people
Prix Renaudot des lycéens winners